Quintin McKellar  is a British veterinary surgeon and academic. In the 2011 New Year Honours list, he was appointed a CBE for services to science during his tenure as principal of the Royal Veterinary College. Since January 2011 he has been vice-chancellor of the University of Hertfordshire.

Early life and education
McKellar grew up in Renfrewshire, Scotland, and graduated from the University of Glasgow School of Veterinary Medicine in 1981. Upon graduating, he remained at Glasgow so that he could continue to train there as a member of the university's rowing club, and he gained a PhD in veterinary parasitology in 1984.

McKellar represented Scotland as a rower at the 1986 Commonwealth Games, finishing fifth in two events, the eight and the coxless four.

Career
After obtaining his PhD in the study of Ostertagia ostertagi, a parasite of cattle, McKellar remained at Glagow University in the department of pharmacology, researching anthelmintics, and became head of the department in 1988. In 1996, Glasgow awarded McKellar a personal professorship. McKellar remained Professor of Veterinary Parasitology at Glasgow until 1997, when he became Scientific Director and Chief Executive of the Moredun Research Institute, a post which he held until the end of 2003. From 2004 until the end of 2010, he was principal of the Royal Veterinary College of the University of London. In January 2011, McKellar became vice-chancellor of the University of Hertfordshire, succeeding Tim Wilson.

In 2015 he was elected as a board member of Universities UK and is chair of the University Vocational Awards Council.

He is chair of the board of trustees of the Pirbright Institute, and co-chair of the National Centre for Universities and Business (NCUB) Food Economy Task Force. a member of the Hertfordshire Local Enterprise Partnership, and chair of the Hatfield Renewal Project Board. and was a member of the Government Chief Scientist Steering Group on Animal and Plant Health in the UK.

Fellowships
 2001 Fellowship of the Institute of Biology
 2002 Fellowship of the Royal Agricultural Societies
 2003 Fellowship of the Royal Society of Edinburgh
 2009 Fellowship of the Royal Society for the Encouragement of Arts, Manufactures and Commerce 
 2016 Fellowship of the Royal College of Veterinary Surgeons

Academic awards
 Pfizer Academic Award for Animal Health Research 1986
 The Wellcome Trust Medal for Veterinary Research 1993
 British Small Animal Veterinary Association Amoroso Award 1995
 Royal Agricultural Society Bledisloe Award 2000
 Saltire Society Scottish Science Award 2001
 British Veterinary Association Wooldrich Award 2002

Public lectures 
 Therapy for Livestock in a Global Community, Elixir or Crutch. Saltire Society Science Award. Royal Society of Edinburgh 2001.
 Pride and Prejudice. The Wooldrich Lecture, British Veterinary Association, Stratford, 2002.
 The Future of Animal Welfare. Royal Philosophical Society of Glasgow, Glasgow 2003.
 How can milk cost less than water?  Royal Society of Arts Annual President's Lecture, London 2009.

Notable publications

References

Scottish veterinarians
Vice-Chancellors of the University of Hertfordshire
Living people
British pharmacologists
Alumni of the University of Glasgow
Commanders of the Order of the British Empire
People associated with the University of Hertfordshire
People associated with the Royal Veterinary College
Fellows of the Royal Society of Biology
Fellows of the Royal Society of Edinburgh
Year of birth missing (living people)
Fellows of the Royal College of Veterinary Surgeons
Academics of the University of Glasgow